In the Hunt is a 1993 scrolling shooter arcade video game developed and published by Irem. Versions for the PlayStation, Sega Saturn, and Microsoft Windows were also released. The player assumes control of the Granvia, a submarine tasked with overthrowing the Dark Anarchy Society before they activate their doomsday device. Gameplay involves shooting enemies, collecting power-up items, and avoiding collision with projectiles. It runs on the Irem M-92 hardware.

The game was conceived by Kazuma Kujo, and designed by the same group of people that later went on to found Nazca Corporation, the creators of the Metal Slug series. Kujo was inspired to create a water-based shooter, with player-dependent scrolling and simultaneous multiplayer being its main focus. The overall concept of submarine warfare was inspired by Kujo's leisure with a water fountain. In the Hunt was met with mixed reception from critics since its initial release, specifically the home conversions; common complaints were towards the lack of innovation and slowdown, although it was praised for its detailed graphics and gameplay. Nevertheless, it has since gained a cult following in Japan.

Gameplay

In the Hunt is an underwater-themed scrolling shoot 'em up game, with its gameplay described as a cross between Metal Slug (1996) and the classic shooter R-Type (1987). The plot involves an organization named the Dark Anarchy Society (D.A.S.) attempting to launch a superweapon over a post-apocalyptic earth. To stop this, a submarine named the Granvia is deployed to stop the D.A.S. and protect what is left of the planet. The game does not scroll automatically, as the player is able to move the Granvia at their own will. In each level, the objective is to destroy enemies, avoid their projectiles, and defeat the end level boss. The Granvia begins the game with forward-moving missiles, which defeat most enemies with one hit. Missiles can be launched upwards to destroy enemies above the player. Destroying specific enemy types rewards the player with a power-up, which give the Granvia access to new weapon types. Weapons include a powerful machine gun, a wave cannon, and a "cracker" shot that launches a barrage of bullets at enemies. Some enemies drop red orbs embossed with stars, which award bonus points when collected. The game has multiple endings.

Development and release
In the Hunt was designed by a group of Irem employees that would later go on to found Nazca Corporation, the creators of the Metal Slug series. Kazuma Kujo served as its designer, writing the concept and overseeing development of the project during his time working at Irem. Kujo stated that plans for a shoot 'em up title had already been settled by the management at Irem, however he decided to make it for co-op play but disliked genre conventions such as forced scrolling and wanted the thematic to be different instead of the standard space motive found in other shooters at the time. The concept of playing as submarines was inspired during Kujo's leisure near a fountain which, after hearing the water sounds, prompted him to pursue the idea. Artist Akio Oyabu served as the game's graphic designer.

In the Hunt was first released in arcades in April 1993, running on the Irem M-92 board. The game was ported to various platforms including the Sega Saturn and PlayStation in 1995 by Tsuji Jimusho and SIMS respectively, followed by a Microsoft Windows version in 1997 by Xing Entertainment. A Super Nintendo Entertainment System conversion was shown at the 1994 Consumer Electronics Show in a playable state, but it was never released. In 2019, Hamster Corporation digitally re-released In the Hunt for the Nintendo Switch and PlayStation 4, published under their Arcade Archives series. In the Hunt is planned to be included as part of the Irem Arcade 1 compilation for Evercade.

Reception

In Japan, Game Machine listed In the Hunt on their June 1, 1993 issue as being the sixth most-popular arcade game at the time. Play Meter listed In the Hunt to be the sixteenth most-popular arcade game at the time. RePlay also reported In the Hunt to be the fifth most-popular arcade game at the time.

Electronic Gaming Monthly gave the PlayStation version a positive review, with their four reviewers particularly praising the huge number of enemies on-screen for the bulk of the game and the minimal slowdown. GamePro were also positive in their assessment: "The very detailed graphics are supported by audio that's loaded with blasts. The controls are sluggish but mostly accurate. This sub floats above other PlayStation shooters like Galactic Attack [sic - Galactic Attack was released for the Saturn, not the PlayStation] and Jupiter Strike." Maximum expressed enthusiasm for "little innovations" like the mine powerups and the King Canute boss, but nonetheless concluded the game to be "an all-too familiar mission." They also criticized that the game is too easy, short, and lacking in replay value, all criticisms that were shared by one of EGM's reviewers. A reviewer for Next Generation actually praised the game for having some mild slowdown, saying that it reflects the phenomenally high level of action going on. However, he generally panned the game for the slow movement of the player's submarine, and concluded that "while very young gamers might enjoy the lightshow, the lethargic tempo and lack of originality are sure to put anyone over the age of 10 to sleep."

Sega Saturn Magazine described the game as unoriginal and outdated, but enjoyable, with a strong sense of tongue-in-cheek humor and ingeniously designed boss fights. They concluded, "Nothing particularly new or exciting here, but In the Hunt is good fun to play, featuring loads of exciting battles and explosions." Scary Larry of GamePro found the Saturn version does not hold up well to either the PlayStation version or recent Saturn shooters such as Panzer Dragoon II and Darius Gaiden, particularly due to its frequent slowdown. He nonetheless concluded it to be "a great rental" and "a good buy if you're feeling nostalgic."

Notes

References

External links
 In the Hunt at Killer List of Videogames

1993 video games
Arcade video games
Cancelled Super Nintendo Entertainment System games
Cooperative video games
Imagineer games
Irem games
Multiplayer and single-player video games
Nintendo Switch games
PlayStation (console) games
PlayStation Network games
PlayStation 4 games
Post-apocalyptic video games
Scrolling shooters
Sega Saturn games
SIMS Co., Ltd. games
Video games developed in Japan
Video games featuring female protagonists
Video games with alternate endings
Windows games
Submarine simulation video games
Hamster Corporation games
Xing Entertainment games